The , also called the , is a streetcar line of Hiroshima Electric Railway (Hiroden) in Hiroshima, Japan. The line has been operated since 1944.

Although the line is registered at the Ministry of Land, Infrastructure, Transport and Tourism under the rarely used name "Minani Line", Hiroden officially calls it "Hijiyama Line".

The total distance of the line is 2.5 kilometers. Route 5 operates on the line. The line has seven stations, numbered H3 through H9.

Stations

References

See also

Hijiyama Line
Railway lines opened in 1944